Contrexéville is a commune of north-eastern France, in the Vosges département. Inhabitants are called Contrexévillois.

The mineral springs of Contrexéville have been known locally for many years, but became generally known only towards the end of the 18th century. Mineral water is bottled here by Nestlé Waters France, under the Contrex brand.

Main sights
 Arboretum de Contrexéville

Twin towns
Contrexéville is twinned with:
  Bad Rappenau, Germany
  Llandrindod Wells, United Kingdom
  Luso, Portugal
  Mealhada, Portugal

See also
 Communes of the Vosges department
 Lion and Sun#Other (non-Iranian) variants

References

External links

 Town council website
 Tourism office of Contrexéville

Communes of Vosges (department)
Spa towns in France